The 2007 Wimbledon Championships was a tennis tournament played on grass courts at the All England Lawn Tennis and Croquet Club in Wimbledon, London in the United Kingdom. It was the 121st edition of the Wimbledon Championships and were held from 25 June to 8 July 2007. It was the third Grand Slam tennis event of the year.

Reconstruction work on Centre Court was in progress and thus it had no roof. The Wimbledon Championships adopted Hawk-Eye technology for the first time on Centre Court and Court 1. The Cyclops system was still used on other courts.

The Gentlemen's final was won by Roger Federer for the fifth consecutive time, a feat only before achieved in the Open Era by Björn Borg. It was the third longest men's singles final of all time at 3 hours and 45 minutes. Venus Williams claimed the Ladies' title by defeating Frenchwoman Marion Bartoli, a surprise finalist who had defeated world number one at the time Justine Henin. For the first time in twenty years, the Championships saw a home player win a senior title as Jamie Murray won the mixed doubles with Serbian partner Jelena Janković.

Point and prize money distribution

Point distribution
Below are the tables with the point distribution for each discipline of the tournament.

Senior points

Prize distribution
On 24 April 2007, Wimbledon announced that the prize money would increase to £700,000 (US$1.4 million) for men and women singles champions. The total prize fund would be £11,282,710 (US$22,565,420), the highest any tennis tournament has ever offered.

* per team

Champions

Seniors

Men's singles

 Roger Federer defeated  Rafael Nadal, 7–6(9–7), 4–6, 7–6(7–3), 2–6, 6–2 
 Federer won his fifth consecutive title, equalling the modern-era record set by Björn Borg. It was also the first time that Federer had played five sets in the final of a Grand Slam.

Women's singles

 Venus Williams defeated  Marion Bartoli, 6–4, 6–1 
 The final was fought between the two lowest seeds ever to appear in a Wimbledon final, with Williams starting the tournament as the no. 23 seed and Bartoli as the no. 18 seed.

Men's doubles

 Arnaud Clément /  Michaël Llodra defeated  Bob Bryan /  Mike Bryan, 6–7(5–7), 6–3, 6–4, 6–4 
 It was Clément's 1st and only career Grand Slam doubles title. It was Llodra's 3rd career Grand Slam doubles title and his 1st at Wimbledon.

Women's doubles

 Cara Black /  Liezel Huber defeated  Katarina Srebotnik /  Ai Sugiyama, 3–6, 6–3, 6–2 
 It was Black's 4th career Grand Slam doubles title and her 3rd at Wimbledon. It was Huber's 3rd career Grand Slam doubles title and her 2nd at Wimbledon.

Mixed doubles

 Jamie Murray /  Jelena Janković defeated  Jonas Björkman /  Alicia Molik, 6–4, 3–6, 6–1 
 This marked the first grand slam win of both Jamie Murray and Jelena Janković.

Juniors

Boys' singles

 Donald Young defeated  Vladimir Ignatic, 7–5, 6–1

Girls' singles

 Urszula Radwańska defeated  Madison Brengle, 2–6, 6–3, 6–0

Boys' doubles

 Daniel Alejandro López /  Matteo Trevisan defeated  Roman Jebavý /  Martin Kližan, 7–6(5), 4–6, [10–8]

Girls' doubles

 Anastasia Pavlyuchenkova /  Urszula Radwańska defeated  Misaki Doi /  Kurumi Nara, 6–4, 2–6, [10–7]

Other events

Gentlemen's invitation doubles
 Jacco Eltingh /  Paul Haarhuis defeated  Mark Petchey /  Chris Wilkinson, 6–2, 6–2

Ladies' invitation doubles
 Jana Novotná /  Helena Suková defeated  Ilana Kloss /  Rosalyn Nideffer, 6–3, 6–3

Senior gentlemen's invitation doubles
 Jeremy Bates /  Anders Järryd defeated  Kevin Curren /  Johan Kriek, 6–3, 6–3

Wheelchair men's doubles

 Robin Ammerlaan /  Ronald Vink defeated  Shingo Kunieda /  Satoshi Saida, 4–6, 7–5, 6–2

Tournament timeline

Notable stories

Comebacks
Martina Hingis had to save two match points against British wild card Naomi Cavaday on Day 1, almost repeating her first-round exit from the 2001 championships. Hingis eventually went on to win the match 6–7, 7–5, 6–0.

Janko Tipsarević beat Fernando González 6–3, 3–6, 6–3, 4–6, 8–6 to advance to the fourth round. Tipsarević was ranked 64 and González was seeded 5 but ranked 6, and saved a match point over González.

Tim Henman defeated Carlos Moyá in round 1 after going down two sets to one in a match that lasted two days with a 5th set scoreline of 13–11. Henman failed to convert 6 match points before capitalizing from a double fault by Moya on the 7th match point.

Juan Carlos Ferrero also came back, this time from two sets to none down in a match suspended for 2 days, 7–5 in the 5th set against Jan Hájek.
Nikolay Davydenko made a remarkable comeback against Chris Guccione in round 2, losing the first 2 sets before winning 3–6, 5–7, 7–6, 6–4, 6–2. It was a special comeback because Davydenko, who had a previous horrific record on grass, made it into round 3 of Wimbledon for the first time.

Serena Williams made an unbelievable comeback against Daniela Hantuchová in the Fourth Round. Williams cramped in the second set at 5–5, 30–15 with Hantuchová serving.  She was treated and played to a tiebreak when a rain delay halted play for almost 2 hours.  Both players came back and finished the tiebreak, which Hantuchová won.  Then in the third set, Williams started off slow but powered to a 6–2, 6–7, 6–2 win to advance to the quarterfinals against Justine Henin.

Venus Williams was almost knocked out by Alla Kudryavtseva in her first round match, when she won 2–6, 6–3, 7–5. She was down a set and possible break points before finally winning her match in three sets.

Venus Williams came back from one set all to win a match tightly against Akiko Morigami 6–2, 3–6, 7–5. Morigami had been a game away from victory, but Venus was able to take control and dismiss Morigami.

Nicole Vaidišová knocked out defending champion Amélie Mauresmo in the fourth round to reach her first Wimbledon quarterfinal.  After narrowly winning a first set tie-break and losing the second set to the title holder, Vaidišová came back to win 6–1 in the third set.

Marion Bartoli beat world number one Justine Henin in the women's singles semi-final after losing the first set 6–1 and being a break down in the second. She won the final set 6–1.
Ai Sugiyama and Katarina Srebotnik beat the top seeds Lisa Raymond and Samantha Stosur 1–6, 6–3, 6–2 after being down 6–1, 3–0 in the ladies' doubles semifinal. This was Srebotnik's first Wimbledon final and Sugiyama's fifth.
Ana Ivanovic defeated Nicole Vaidišová 4–6, 6–2, 7–5 having been down a break in the second set and saving three match points at 3–5 down in the third set.

Day-by-day summaries

Day 1
Many matches were cancelled by rain, an ominous precursor to the entire tournament. Top seeds Roger Federer and Justine Henin managed to defeat their opponents easily. Philipp Kohlschreiber became the first seeded player to exit the tournament. Seeded players Martina Hingis and Patty Schnyder were pushed by their opponents, each playing 3 sets with Hingis saving 2 match points. Serena Williams, Marion Bartoli and Shahar Pe'er won their games simply.
Seeded players out: Philipp Kohlschreiber

Day 2
Daniela Hantuchová easily dispatched Anastasia Pavlyuchenkova. Favourites such as Jelena Janković, Maria Sharapova, Amélie Mauresmo, Novak Djokovic, James Blake and Rafael Nadal won their matches with ease. However, Venus Williams was almost knocked out by Alla Kudryavtseva, when she won 2–6, 6–3, 7–5.
Seeded players out: Dominik Hrbatý, Carlos Moyá, Filippo Volandri, Juan Mónaco and Olga Puchkova

Day 3
Andy Roddick and Richard Gasquet advanced towards third round, true to expectations. Justine Henin, Ana Ivanovic, Martina Hingis and Serena Williams also beat their opponents with little difficulty. Lucky loser Alizé Cornet defeated ranked number 42 Maria Kirilenko. Unfortunately the evening matches were delayed due to the rain.
Seeded players out: Samantha Stosur, Anabel Medina Garrigues and Sybille Bammer

Day 4
Dinara Safina became today's highest-ranked woman to lose, while Tommy Robredo the highest-ranked man to lose on day 4. However, other seeded players like Ana Ivanovic, Elena Dementieva, Roger Federer and Marat Safin have done their jobs well and advanced towards third round. Also, Serena and Venus Williams returned to their doubles competitions by beating Anne Keothavong and Claire Curran in the first round.
Seeded players out: Tatiana Golovin, Francesca Schiavone, Tathiana Garbin, Martina Müller, Dinara Safina, Juan Ignacio Chela, David Ferrer, Tommy Robredo and Agustín Calleri
Doubles seeds out: Jeff Coetzee / Rogier Wassen, Yves Allegro / Jim Thomas; Vania King / Jelena Kostanić Tošić

Day 5
The players who began their games at 11 o'clock were delayed by rain, but it did not affect Justine Henin, Jelena Janković and Patty Schnyder who all hastily completed their matches. Anna Chakvetadze is the highest-ranked woman to lose so far, while Fernando González became the highest-seeded man to lose so far.
Seeded players out: Alona Bondarenko, Lucie Šafářová, Anna Chakvetadze, Shahar Pe'er, Martina Hingis, Katarina Srebotnik, Fernando González, Ivan Ljubičić, Dmitry Tursunov, James Blake and Marat Safin
Doubles seeds out: Simon Aspelin / Julian Knowle, Jonas Björkman / Max Mirnyi, Ashley Fisher / Tripp Phillips, Jonathan Erlich / Andy Ram; Dinara Safina / Roberta Vinci, Maria Elena Camerin / Gisela Dulko, Vera Dushevina / Tatiana Perebiynis, Tathiana Garbin / Paola Suárez

Day 6
The tournament suffered massive rain disruptions, with Amélie Mauresmo and Maria Sharapova being the only singles players to complete (and win) their matches. The afternoon matches were also delayed by rain. Fans on Centre and Court 2 received full refunds; because they saw less than an hour of play, with Mauresmo's win lasting 57 minutes.
Seeded players out: Mara Santangelo and Ai Sugiyama

Middle Sunday
Seeded player out: Tommy Haas (injury)

Day 7
There was a little bit of rain and a few surprises too. Although there was more rain, Justine Henin found time to advance to the quarterfinals, while Elena Dementieva surprised everyone by losing to an unseeded Tamira Paszek. Agnieszka Radwańska, after sending seeded Martina Müller out in the second round a few days earlier, couldn't do the same thing to Svetlana Kuznetsova. In a highly intense match, Serena Williams cramped against Daniela Hantuchová late in a second set. Serena battled the injury, losing the second set tie-break but winning after a rain delay.
Seeded players out: Patty Schnyder, Elena Dementieva, Daniela Hantuchová, David Nalbandian and Jarkko Nieminen
Doubles seeds out: Mariusz Fyrstenberg / Marcin Matkowski, Martín García / Sebastián Prieto

Day 8
Most of the women's 4th round matches were delayed by rain, however, some matches were completed; Svetlana Kuznetsova ended Tamira Paszek's dazzling run; 3rd seed and in-form Serb Jelena Janković was defeated by Marion Bartoli; and 2006 champion and 4th seed Amélie Mauresmo fell to Nicole Vaidišová.
Seeded players out: Amélie Mauresmo, Nadia Petrova, Jelena Janković and Guillermo Cañas

Day 9
Rafael Nadal finally won his match against Robin Söderling, which had lasted since Saturday. Other winners today included Novak Djokovic, who advanced into 4th round and Andy Roddick, who is already in the quarterfinals. Richard Gasquet won his match against Jo-Wilfried Tsonga. Maria Sharapova lost to Venus Williams in straight sets 6–1, 6–3 in one of the biggest upsets of the tournament. Justine Henin and Marion Bartoli became the first female semifinalists. The second round doubles match between Brazilians André Sá and Marcelo Melo against Paul Hanley and Kevin Ullyett set two Wimbledon records, one of most games played in a match (102) and the longest fifth set ever (28–26). This was the second longest match in the history of The Championships, at 5 hours and 58 minutes. The Brazilian duo won.
Seeded players out: Maria Sharapova, Michaëlla Krajicek, Serena Williams and Robin Söderling
Doubles seeds out: Jaroslav Levinský / David Škoch, Paul Hanley / Kevin Ullyett; Chan Yung-jan / Chuang Chia-jung, Maria Kirilenko / Elena Vesnina, Sania Mirza / Shahar Pe'er; Mike Bryan / Lisa Raymond, Simon Aspelin / Mara Santangelo, Jonathan Erlich / Elena Vesnina, Kevin Ullyett / Liezel Huber

Day 10
Venus Williams became another semifinalist after her victory over Svetlana Kuznetsova in straight sets again. Ana Ivanovic joined her when she won the match with Nicole Vaidišová, who could not take advantage of three match points she had in the final set, with Ivanovic eventually triumphing 7–5. Novak Djokovic, Marcos Baghdatis, Tomáš Berdych and Rafael Nadal qualified into quarterfinals today. Nadal battled through another 5-set match, although he completed this one on its scheduled day, without any suspensions due to rain.
Seeded players out: Svetlana Kuznetsova, Nicole Vaidišová, Nikolay Davydenko, Jonas Björkman, Mikhail Youzhny and Lleyton Hewitt
Doubles seeds out: Anabel Medina Garrigues / Virginia Ruano Pascual; Rogier Wassen / Chan Yung-jan, Bob Bryan / Samantha Stosur, Mark Knowles / Yan Zi

Day 11
Rafael Nadal became the first male semifinalist, and was soon followed by defending champion Roger Federer and by fourth seed Novak Djokovic. Venus Williams is through to the Ladies' Singles final and Frenchwoman Marion Bartoli joins her making the biggest upset in the tournament, sending number one seeded Justine Henin out. Richard Gasquet, another French player, pulled off the biggest upset of the men's in taking out #3 seed and ranked Roddick.  Roddick had a two set lead before Gasquet won the final 3 sets to book a semi final spot.

Seeded players out: Ana Ivanovic, Justine Henin, Tomáš Berdych, Juan Carlos Ferrero, Marcos Baghdatis and Andy Roddick
Doubles seeds out: Lukáš Dlouhý / Pavel Vízner, Mark Knowles / Daniel Nestor, Martin Damm / Leander Paes; Janette Husárová / Meghann Shaughnessy, Květa Peschke / Rennae Stubbs, Elena Likhovtseva / Sun Tiantian; Andy Ram / Nathalie Dechy, Paul Hanley / Tatiana Perebiynis, Todd Perry / Chia-Jung Chuang, Julian Knowle / Sun Tiantian

Day 12
The final of the Men's Singles was determined, Roger Federer vs. Rafael Nadal, a repeat of the 2006 final and French Open final. Federer won in straight sets against Richard Gasquet, whilst Nadal's opponent, Novak Djokovic, was forced to retire with the match balanced at one set all. Venus Williams won another Wimbledon title against Bartoli in straight sets (6–4, 6–1).
Seeded players out: Marion Bartoli, Richard Gasquet and Novak Djokovic
Doubles seeds out: Fabrice Santoro / Nenad Zimonjić; Lisa Raymond / Samantha Stosur, Alicia Molik / Mara Santangelo; Leander Paes / Meghann Shaughnessy, Daniel Nestor / Elena Likhovtseva, Marcin Matkowski / Cara Black, Pavel Vízner / Květa Peschke

Day 13
Roger Federer won his fifth consecutive Wimbledon title after a five-set battle against Rafael Nadal, 3 sets to 2. Federer's supremacy on grass met a strong challenge from Nadal and the victory did not come easily for the Swiss. But Federer came through by winning the tiebreak in the first and third sets, and faced four break points before victory in the final set. Arnaud Clément and Michaël Llodra, beating number one seeded Bryan brothers, became the Gentlemen's doubles champions, while Cara Black and Liezel Huber were victorious in the Ladies' doubles final. Jamie Murray became the first British player to win a senior Wimbledon title in 20 years by winning the Mixed doubles with Serbian partner Jelena Janković, beating Jonas Björkman and Alicia Molik in 3 sets. Urszula Radwańska maintained the family tradition winning the Girls' singles title like her sister Agnieszka in 2005 and they became the first sisters to win it. Urszula also became the Girls' doubles champion, playing with Anastasia Pavlyuchenkova. The victor of Boys' singles was Donald Young and the best boys' doubles team was Daniel Lopez and Matteo Trevisan. 
Seeded player out: Rafael Nadal
Doubles seeds out: Bob Bryan / Mike Bryan; Katarina Srebotnik / Ai Sugiyama; Jonas Björkman / Alicia Molik

Singles seeds

Men's singles
  Roger Federer (champion)
  Rafael Nadal (final, lost to Roger Federer)
  Andy Roddick (quarterfinals, lost to Richard Gasquet)
  Novak Djokovic (semifinals, retired against Rafael Nadal due to foot injury)
  Fernando González (third round, lost to Janko Tipsarević)
  Nikolay Davydenko (fourth round, lost to Marcos Baghdatis)
  Tomáš Berdych (quarterfinals, lost to Rafael Nadal)
  Andy Murray (withdrew due to wrist injury)
  James Blake (third round, lost to Juan Carlos Ferrero)
  Marcos Baghdatis (quarterfinals, lost to Novak Djokovic)
  Tommy Robredo (second round, lost to Wayne Arthurs)
  Richard Gasquet (semifinals, lost to Roger Federer)
  Tommy Haas (fourth round, withdrew due to injury)
  Mikhail Youzhny (fourth round, lost to Rafael Nadal)
  Ivan Ljubičić (third round, lost to Paul-Henri Mathieu)
  Lleyton Hewitt (fourth round, lost to Novak Djokovic)
  David Ferrer (second round, lost to Paul-Henri Mathieu)
  Jarkko Nieminen (third round, lost to Mikhail Youzhny)
  Jonas Björkman (fourth round, lost to Tomáš Berdych)
  Juan Carlos Ferrero (quarterfinals, lost to Roger Federer)
  Dmitry Tursunov (third round, lost to Tommy Haas)
  Guillermo Cañas (third round, lost to Lleyton Hewitt)
  David Nalbandian (third round, lost to Marcos Baghdatis)
  Juan Ignacio Chela (second round, lost to Édouard Roger-Vasselin)
  Carlos Moyá (first round, lost to Tim Henman)
  Marat Safin (third round, lost to Roger Federer)
  Philipp Kohlschreiber (first round, lost to Florent Serra)
  Robin Söderling (third round, lost to Rafael Nadal)
  Agustín Calleri (second round, lost to Lee Hyung-taik)
  Filippo Volandri (first round, lost to Nicolas Kiefer)
  Dominik Hrbatý (first round, lost to Andreas Seppi)
  Juan Mónaco (first round, lost to Kristof Vliegen)

Women's singles
  Justine Henin  (semifinals, lost to Marion Bartoli)
  Maria Sharapova (fourth round, lost to Venus Williams)
  Jelena Janković (fourth round, lost to Marion Bartoli)
  Amélie Mauresmo (fourth round, lost to Nicole Vaidišová)
  Svetlana Kuznetsova (quarterfinals, lost to Venus Williams)
  Ana Ivanovic (semifinals, lost to Venus Williams)
  Serena Williams (quarterfinals, lost to Justine Henin)
  Anna Chakvetadze (third round, lost to Michaëlla Krajicek)
  Martina Hingis (third round, lost to Laura Granville)
  Daniela Hantuchová (fourth round, lost to Serena Williams)
  Nadia Petrova (fourth round, lost to Ana Ivanovic)
  Elena Dementieva (third round, lost to Tamira Paszek)
  Dinara Safina (second round, lost to Akiko Morigami)
  Nicole Vaidišová (quarterfinals, lost to Ana Ivanovic)
  Patty Schnyder (fourth round, lost to Justine Henin)
  Shahar Pe'er (third round, lost to Marion Bartoli)
  Tatiana Golovin (second round, lost to Tamira Paszek)
  Marion Bartoli (final, lost to Venus Williams)
  Katarina Srebotnik (third round, lost to Daniela Hantuchová)
  Sybille Bammer (second round, lost to Laura Granville)
  Tathiana Garbin (second round, lost to Victoria Azarenka)
  Anabel Medina Garrigues (first round, lost to Virginia Ruano Pascual)
  Venus Williams (champion)
  Alona Bondarenko (third round, lost to Patty Schnyder)
  Lucie Šafářová (third round, lost to Jelena Janković)
  Ai Sugiyama (third round, lost to Maria Sharapova)
  Samantha Stosur (second round, lost to Milagros Sequera)
  Mara Santangelo (third round, lost to Amélie Mauresmo)
  Francesca Schiavone (second round, lost to Aravane Rezaï)
  Olga Puchkova (first round, lost to Elena Vesnina)
  Michaëlla Krajicek (quarterfinals, lost to Marion Bartoli)
  Martina Müller (second round, lost to Agnieszka Radwańska)

Wild card entries
The following players received wild cards into the main draw senior events.

Men's singles
  Jamie Baker
  Richard Bloomfield
  Alex Bogdanovic
  Marin Čilić
  Thiemo de Bakker
  Josh Goodall
  Jonathan Marray
  Jo-Wilfried Tsonga

Women's singles
  Elena Baltacha
  Naomi Cavaday
  Anne Keothavong
  Viktoriya Kutuzova
  Katie O'Brien
  Anastasia Pavlyuchenkova
  Melanie South
  Caroline Wozniacki

Men's doubles
  Jamie Baker /  Alex Bogdanovic
  Neil Bamford /  Jim May
  Richard Bloomfield /  Jonathan Marray
  Lee Childs /  Jamie Delgado
  Josh Goodall /  Ross Hutchins

Women's doubles
  Elena Baltacha /  Naomi Cavaday
  Sarah Borwell /  Jade Curtis
  Claire Curran /  Anne Keothavong
  Karen Paterson /  Melanie South
  Serena Williams /  Venus Williams

Mixed doubles
  James Auckland /  Claire Curran
  Alex Bogdanovic /  Melanie South
  Richard Bloomfield /  Sarah Borwell
  Lee Childs /  Katie O'Brien
  Jamie Delgado /  Anne Keothavong

Qualifier entries

Men's singles

 Wang Yeu-tzuoo
 Nicolas Mahut
 Édouard Roger-Vasselin
 Aisam-ul-Haq Qureshi
 Bobby Reynolds
 Bohdan Ulihrach
 Sam Warburg
 Zack Fleishman
 Lee Childs
 Alejandro Falla
 Gilles Müller
 Rik de Voest
 Wayne Arthurs
 Mischa Zverev
 Fernando Vicente
 Tomáš Zíb

The following players received entry into the lucky loser spot:
 Frank Dancevic
 Kevin Kim

Women's singles

 Ágnes Szávay
 Kristina Brandi
 Casey Dellacqua
 Nika Ožegović
 Jorgelina Cravero
 Ayumi Morita
 Olga Govortsova
 Hsieh Su-wei
 Tatiana Perebiynis
 Hana Šromová
 Yan Zi
 Barbora Záhlavová-Strýcová

The following player received entry into the lucky loser spot:
 Alizé Cornet

Men's doubles

 Scott Lipsky /  David Martin
 Harel Levy /  Rajeev Ram
 Ilija Bozoljac /  Dick Norman
 Alex Kuznetsov /  Mischa Zverev

The following teams received entry into the lucky loser spot:
 Lars Burgsmüller /  Orest Tereshchuk
 Sanchai Ratiwatana /  Sonchat Ratiwatana
 Kevin Kim /  Robert Smeets

Women's doubles

 Hsieh Su-wei /  Alla Kudryavtseva
 Julie Ditty /  Raquel Kops-Jones
 Stéphanie Foretz /  Selima Sfar
 Sofia Arvidsson /  Lilia Osterloh

The following teams received entry into the lucky loser spot:
 Andrea Hlaváčková /  Sandra Klösel
 Hana Šromová /  Klára Zakopalová
 Anna Fitzpatrick /  Emily Webley-Smith

Protected ranking
The following players were accepted directly into the main draw using a protected ranking: 
Men's Singles
  Igor Andreev
  Justin Gimelstob
  Nicolas Kiefer

Withdrawn players

Men's singles
 José Acasuso → replaced by  Lu Yen-hsun
 Mario Ančić → replaced by  Frank Dancevic
 Gastón Gaudio → replaced by  Juan Pablo Guzmán
 Xavier Malisse → replaced by  Michael Berrer
 Jürgen Melzer → replaced by  Iván Navarro
 Andy Murray → replaced by  Kevin Kim
 Paradorn Srichaphan → replaced by  Davide Sanguinetti

Women's singles
 Li Na → replaced by  Alizé Cornet
 Anastasia Myskina → replaced by  Anna Smashnova
 Romina Oprandi → replaced by  Melinda Czink
 Zheng Jie → replaced by  Catalina Castaño
 Vera Zvonareva → replaced by  Aleksandra Wozniak

Media coverage
Broadcasters of the 2007 Wimbledon Championships were as follows:

Europe
Belgium – VRT, RTL-TVI
Bosnia and Herzegovina – OBN
Bulgaria – Diema Vision Plc
Croatia – HRT TV
Czech Republic – ČT4
Denmark – TV 2 Sport
Finland – MTV3, MTV3 MAX
France – Canal+ (Sport Plus)
Georgia – First Channel
Germany – DSF, Premiere
Greece – Supersport
Hungary – Sport1
Ireland – TG4
Italy – Sky Sport
Macedonia – MKRTV
Malta – Melita Cable
Montenegro – TVCG
Netherlands – RTL 7
Norway – NRK, Sport Expressen
Poland – Polsat
Portugal – Sport TV
Romania – Sport.ro
Russia – NTV Plus
Serbia – RTS, Sport Klub, TV Koha
Slovenia – RTV
Spain – Canal+ (Sogecable)
Sweden – Sport Expressen
Switzerland – SRG/SSR TV
Turkey – Media Eye
United Kingdom – BBC

Worldwide
Australia – Nine Network, Fox Sports (Fox Sports 1, Fox Sports 2)
Canada – Global, TSN, RDS
Japan – NHK, Gaora
New Zealand – Sky Network, Prime
South Africa – SuperSport
United States – ESPN (ESPN2), NBC, Tapesh
Israel – Sport 5 (including Sport 5+ and Sport 5+ Live)
Iran – IRIB
Asia – ESPN Star Sports, BBTV Thailand
Latin America – ESPN Sur, ESPN 2
Middle East – ART
South America – Globosat (Brazil)
Other – Fiji TV

See also
 2007 in tennis

References

External links

 Official Wimbledon Championships website